Memorial Park Cemetery was founded in 1924 by E. Clovis Hinds on initial 54 acres (.22 km2). It is located at 5668 Poplar Avenue in Memphis, Tennessee.

Different species of trees of different ages, as well as bushes, can be found throughout the cemetery, enhancing the atmosphere of a park-like setting.

The cemetery is noted for its Crystal Shrine Grotto, a hand-built cave depicting Biblical scenes built by artist Dionicio Rodriguez.

The cemetery is owned by the private death care industry company, NorthStar Memorial Group, based in Houston.

Crystal Shrine Grotto
In 1935 Mexican artist Dionicio Rodriguez was hired to beautify the park with sculptures. Annie Laurie's Wishing Chairchairman, Broken Tree Bench, Abrahams Oak, Pool of Hebron and Cave of Machpelah are some of the most important sculptures that can be found in different locations throughout the cemetery.

In 1938 construction of the Crystal Shrine Grotto began. The grotto is a 60 ft (18.3 m) deep, hand-built cave in a hillside near the center of the cemetery, filled with 5 tons (4.5 t) of quartz crystal, hence the name Crystal Shrine Grotto. The grotto was completed after Rodriguez' death in 1955. The shrines in the grotto illustrate the stages of "Christ's Journey on the Earth from Birth to Resurrection".

Since 1991, the Crystal Shrine Grotto has been listed on the National Register of Historic Places for Tennessee.

Notable burials
 James Pinckney Alley, early cartoonist
 Bobby Bland, American blues singer
 Don Briscoe, actor
 Laura Bullion, female Old West outlaw
 Ronnie Caldwell, musician with the Bar-Kays
 Jimmy Griffin, musician
 Isaac Hayes, singer and actor
 Bill Justis, musician, composer, arranger
 Shawn Lane, composer, guitarist, pianist, musician
 Charlie Lea, baseball player
 Gilbert Earl Patterson, Presiding Bishop of the Church of God in Christ
 Sam Phillips, record producer
 Jay Reatard, musician
 Charlie Rich, singer
 Bob Welch, musician, former Fleetwood Mac member
 Red West, actor, songwriter
 George Klein (DJ), DJ and television host
 John (Long Tom) Thomas Winsett, MLB player

See also
 List of cemeteries in the United States

References

External links
 Memorial Park Website
 

Geography of Memphis, Tennessee
Cemeteries on the National Register of Historic Places in Tennessee
Tourist attractions in Memphis, Tennessee
Protected areas of Shelby County, Tennessee
1924 establishments in Tennessee
National Register of Historic Places in Memphis, Tennessee